Mammillaria microhelia is a species of plant in the family Cactaceae. It is endemic to Mexico.  Its natural habitat is hot deserts.

References

microhelia
Cacti of Mexico
Endemic flora of Mexico
Taxonomy articles created by Polbot
Plants described in 1930